Orphir (pronounced , Old Norse: Jorfjara/Orfjara) is a parish and settlement on Mainland, Orkney.

A chief residence was the Hall of Clestrain; and chief antiquities include the ruins of Earl Paul's Palace, remains of pre-Reformation chapels, the Round Kirk and several tumuli.

The ferry terminal of Houton is located in Orphir. The ferries to Flotta and Hoy (Lyness) depart from this point.

Notable people
 John Rae (30 September 1813 – 22 July 1893), the explorer of Canada's Arctic was born at the Hall of Clestrain in this parish.
 Henry Halcro Johnston, botanist and international rugby union player was born and died at Orphir.
 Jamie Halcro Johnston, Scottish Conservative MSP, was brought up at Orphir.
 Margaret Manson Graham (1860-1933), missionary nurse in Nigeria, born in Orphir

References

This article incorporates text from -
Wilson, Rev. John The Gazetteer of Scotland (Edinburgh, 1882) Published by W. & A.K. Johnstone

Villages on Mainland, Orkney
Parishes of Orkney
Tumuli in Scotland